KJJF (88.9 FM) is a non-commercial radio station in Harlingen, Texas. KHID (88.1 FM) is also a non-commercial FM radio station in McAllen, Texas. Both stations are owned and operated affiliates of Relevant Radio's Catholic radio network and serve the Rio Grande Valley.  They formerly broadcast in Spanish but have since been broadcasting in English.

KJJF's transmitter is located on Fresnal Road in San Benito.  KHID's transmitter is off West Monte Cristo Road in La Homa.

History
88.9 FM signed on the air on April 30, 1991, as KMBH-FM.  It began airing NPR programming in June of the same year.  KMBH-FM has an effective radiated power (ERP) of 3,000 watts, while some of the commercial FM stations in the air run 100,000 watts, so KMBH-FM's signal was limited mainly to Cameron County, Texas.

Then in July 1992, 88.1 FM signed on as KHID.  While KHID is also limited in power, the combination of the two stations give coverage to most areas of the McAllen-Brownsville-Harligen radio market.  Both stations were owned by Rio Grande Valley Educational Broadcasting, a subsidiary of the Roman Catholic Diocese of Brownsville.  The two stations began simulcasting news and talk programming from NPR with some hours devoted to classical music and jazz.

On April 3, 2015, RGV Educational Broadcasting announced that it would change KMBH-FM's call letters to KJJF effective April 7. The new call sign honors RGV Educational Broadcasting founder Bishop John Joseph Fitzpatrick.  It also distinguishes the radio station from former sister station Channel 38 KMBH television, which was sold to R Communications several months earlier.

In early 2019, the diocese announced that both stations would be bought by Immaculate Heart Media, Inc. for $1.25 million. Both stations became affiliates of Relevant Radio's Spanish language Catholic radio network after the purchase was finalized on May 30, 2019.

See also
 KFXV (TV)

References

External links
 

Harlingen, Texas
Radio stations established in 1991
1991 establishments in Texas
JJF
Relevant Radio stations